Stoke Lacy is a small village and civil parish in the English county of Herefordshire.

History
The village lies in the verdant, agricultural and undulating landscape of NE Herefordshire. It has a population of circa 450 souls and 135 houses.
The church dates back to Norman times on what is believed to be a much older Celtic/Saxon site. The current church is a Victorian rebuild.  In 1863 the architect F. R. Kempson, son of a previous rector renovated and remodelled the church of St Peter and St Paul leaving only the Norman arch with a screen and leaf frieze on the cornice. The Kempson's were forebears of the Redgrave acting family. The church has several stained glass windows dedicated to the Morgan's and the family graves are in the grave yard. Henry Morgan was rector from 1871 followed by his son George, the father of HFS.
The church and village is famous for the wealthy Morgan family from which HFS Morgan invested the three wheeler car in 1909 and led to the creation of the iconic, globally famous Morgan Motor Company's range of stylish sports cars.  The church has several stained glass windows dedicated to the Morgan's and the family graves are in the grave yard. Henry Morgan was rector from 1871 followed by his son George, the father of HFS.
From 1938, Symonds Cider and English Wine Company was based in Stoke Lacy. This company operated as a family firm until it was taken over by Greenall & Whitley in 1984, and then Bulmers in 1989. The plant in Stoke Lacy closed in 2000. The Wye Valley Brewery producing real ale is now located in the village on the Symonds site.
Stoke Lacy possesses a thriving public house and restaurant, the Plough, and a village hall, opposite, with excellent facilities and parking for meetings and events.

Local facilities
Stoke Lacy Village Hall is located in the centre of the village on land donated by Bill Symonds following the closure of the Symonds brewery. It has a large function room, car park and lawns.

See also
 List of Parish churches in England

References

External links

Villages in Herefordshire